Danika Atchia is a Mauritian model and beauty pageant titleholder who was crowned Miss Mauritius 2015 and represented her country at Miss European Union Tour 2016 pageant. Atchia attended the University of Prince Edward Island and was part of their athletics team UPEI Panthers from 2018 till 2020.

Personal life

Miss Mauritius 2015
June 27, 2015, Atchia was crowned as Miss Mauritius 2015  at the Club Med La Plantation d'Albion. At the same event, the 1st Runners-up was Miss World Mauritius 2015, Veronique Allas and the 2nd Runner-up became Miss International Mauritius 2015, Manjusha Faugoo. As Miss Mauritius, Danika will now represent her country at Miss European Union Tour 2016 pageant.

In 2015, Danika went to Top Model of the World 2015 to represent Mauritius.

Awards
Miss Mauritius 2015 - Won
Miss Elegance 2015 - Won
Miss Talent 2015 - Won

References

Year of birth missing (living people)
Living people
People from Port Louis District
Mauritian female models
Mauritian beauty pageant winners
Mauritian people of French descent
Mauritian female athletes
University of Prince Edward Island alumni
Mauritian expatriates in the United States